Detour is a 2021 Nigerian movie written and directed by Jide Okeke and produced by Jumafor Ajogwu under the production company of Afribold Capital The movie was written in 2010 and was produced a decade later. It stars Jemima Osunde, Kanayo O. Kanayo, Olumide Oworo

Synopsis 
The movie revolves around a journalist and a corps member who accidentally meet and reveal a massive conspiracy.

Premiere 
The movie was released to Cinemas nationwide on the 12th November 2021.

Cast 
Kanayo O. Kanayo, Monalisa Chinda, Jemimah Osunde, Olumide Oworu, Tomiwa Tegbe, Uzor Osimpka, Brutus Richards

References 

2021 films
Nigerian crime drama films
English-language Nigerian films